Angel Yusev (born 23 July 1988) is a Bulgarian footballer who currently plays as a goalkeeper for Bansko.

Career
Yusev started the 2012–13 A PFG season in Pirin Gotse Delchev as an understudy to Abdi Abdikov. He made his A PFG debut on 2 March 2013, starting in goal in a 2–0 defeat to Minyor Pernik. 

In the summer of 2015, Ysev began training with Lokomotiv Sofia, but eventually returned to Botev Vratsa after not being able to secure a contract with the "railwaymen".

In January 2017, Yusev joined Bansko.

References

External links
 

1988 births
Living people
Bulgarian footballers
Association football goalkeepers
PFC Pirin Gotse Delchev players
FC Oborishte players
FC Botev Vratsa players
FC Bansko players
First Professional Football League (Bulgaria) players